Diversivalva is a genus of moths in the family Cosmopterigidae. It contains only one species, Diversivalva minutella, which is found in Russia.

References

Cosmopteriginae